Vaazhkai Oppandham is a 1959 Indian Tamil-language comedy drama film, produced and directed by K. V. Reddy. It stars Akkineni Nageswara Rao and Jamuna, with music composed by Ghantasala. The film was simultaneously made in Telugu as Pellinaati Pramanalu (1958) with a slightly different cast, but was released on 4 September 1959.

Plot

Cast 
Akkineni Nageswara Rao as Krishnan
Jamuna as Rukmini
K. Sarangapani
Rajasulochana as Radha
M. N. Nambiar
T. P. Muthulakshmi
S. V. Ranga Rao as Rukmini's father
A. Karunanidhi
Thanjai N. Ramaiah Dass as a socialist leader (cameo appearance)

Soundtrack 
Music was composed by Ghantasala. Lyrics were written by Thanjai N. Ramaiah Dass.

Release and reception 
Vaazhkai Oppandham was released on 4 September 1959, nearly a year after its Telugu version. It was previously scheduled for 27 March. Kanthan of Kalki criticised the film's play-like feel, and felt it was perpetuating this flaw of Tamil cinema. The film performed average at the box office, though it recovered its investment.

References

External links 
 

1950s feminist films
1950s Tamil-language films
1959 comedy-drama films
1959 films
Films about Indian weddings
Films about women in India
Films directed by K. V. Reddy
Films scored by Ghantasala (musician)
Indian black-and-white films
Indian comedy-drama films
Indian feminist films
Social realism in film
Tamil remakes of Telugu films